This is a list of people who were born, raised, or otherwise closely associated with Atlanta, Georgia, United States.

Academics

Actors

Sports

Business people

Directors

Journalists

Musicians

Politicians and activists

Conrad Tillard (born 1964), politician, Baptist minister, radio host, author, and activist

Religious leaders

Writers and artists

See also

 List of people from Georgia (U.S. state)

References

Atlanta
Atlanta, Georgia
 People
People